The 1949 Houston Cougars football team was an American football team that represented the University of Houston in the Gulf Coast Conference during the 1949 college football season. In its second season under head coach Clyde Lee, the team compiled a 5–4–1 record (1–2 against conference opponents) and finished in third place in the GCC. Aubrey Baker and Cecil Towns were the team captains. The team played its home games at Public School Stadium in Houston.

Schedule

References

Houston
Houston Cougars football seasons
Houston Cougars football